Joe Tetley (born 14 April 1995) is an English cricketer. He made his first-class debut on 2 April 2015 for Cambridge MCCU against Northamptonshire. He was educated at Mount St Mary's College followed by Anglia Ruskin University.

References

External links
 

1995 births
Living people
English cricketers
Cambridge MCCU cricketers
Cricketers from Sheffield
Cambridgeshire cricketers
English cricketers of the 21st century
People educated at Mount St Mary's College